Shotaro Omori (born October 23, 1995) is an American figure skater. He is the 2013 World Junior bronze medalist and 2013 U.S. national junior silver medalist. He is currently a coach at the Pasadena Ice Skating Center.

Programs

Competitive highlights 
CS: Challenger Series; JGP: Junior Grand Prix

References

External links 
 
 Shotaro Omori at IceNetwork

1995 births
American male single skaters
American sportspeople of Japanese descent
Living people
People from Bellflower, California
World Junior Figure Skating Championships medalists